Bouley Bay Hill Climb is a hillclimbing event held in Trinity, Jersey, and organised by The Jersey Motor Cycle and Light Car Club. The course on Les Charrières du Boulay was "first used for competition in 1921" and since 1947 has hosted a round (latterly two rounds) of the British Hill Climb Championship. Bouley Bay and Val des Terres hill climb in Guernsey are normally held in July and provide a two-stop tour for UK drivers contesting the series.

Of the 1947 event Raymond Mays said: "My E.R.A.'s time counted as a record because, although it was slower than the figure set the previous year by Bainbridge's 1½-litre E.R.A., the 1947 climb was run for the first time from a standing start."

The 2008 meeting included rounds 17 and 18 of the British Hill Climb Championship, both being won by Scott Moran.

Bouley Bay Hill Climb past winners

Key: R = Course Record; FTD = Fastest Time of the Day.

See also
 Val des Terres Hill Climb

Footnotes

External links
 Jersey Motorcycle & Light Car Club

Hillclimbs
Sport in Jersey
Trinity, Jersey
Recurring sporting events established in 1921
1921 establishments in Jersey